The 1967 FA Charity Shield was the 45th FA Charity Shield, an annual football match held between the winners of the previous season's Football League and FA Cup competitions. The match was contested by Manchester United, who had won the 1966–67 Football League, and Tottenham Hotspur, who had won the 1966–67 FA Cup, at Old Trafford, Manchester,  on 12 August 1967. The match was drawn 3–3, which meant that the two clubs shared the Shield, holding it for six months each. Bobby Charlton scored two goals for United, while Denis Law scored their third. Jimmy Robertson and Frank Saul scored for Spurs, but the match is most famous for Tottenham's second goal, which was scored by goalkeeper Pat Jennings. Ball in hand, Jennings punted it downfield, only for it to bounce in front of United goalkeeper Alex Stepney, over his head and into the goal.

Match details

See also
1966–67 Football League
1966–67 FA Cup

References

External links
Match Details

1967
Charity Shield
Charity Shield 1967
Charity Shield 1967
FA Charity Shield